The Kizimkazi Dimbani Mosque (Misikiti wa kale wa Kizimkazi Dimbani in Swahili) is a mosque Located in the town of Dimbani, Kusini District of Unguja South Region in Tanzania. It is situated on the southern tip of the island of Zanzibar in Tanzania and is one of the oldest Islamic buildings on the East African coast. According to a preserved kufic inscription, it was built in 1107. Although the inscription and certain coral-carved decorative elements date from the period of construction, the majority of the present structure was rebuilt in the 18th century.

See also 
 Historic Swahili Settlements

References

1107 establishments
12th-century establishments in Africa
Mosques in Zanzibar
Shirazi people
Religious buildings and structures completed in 1107
12th-century mosques
Swahili architecture